Triton is the largest natural satellite of the planet Neptune, and was the first Neptunian moon to be discovered, on October 10, 1846, by English astronomer William Lassell. It is the only large moon in the Solar System with a retrograde orbit, an orbit in the direction opposite to its planet's rotation. Because of its retrograde orbit and composition similar to Pluto, Triton is thought to have been a dwarf planet, captured from the Kuiper belt.

At  in diameter, it is the seventh-largest moon in the Solar System, the only satellite of Neptune massive enough to be in hydrostatic equilibrium, the second-largest planetary moon concerning its primary (after Earth's Moon), and larger than Pluto. Triton is one of the few moons in the Solar System known to be geologically active (the others being Jupiter's Io and Europa, and Saturn's Enceladus and Titan). As a consequence, its surface is relatively young, with few obvious impact craters. Intricate cryovolcanic and tectonic terrains suggest a complex geological history. Triton has a surface of mostly frozen nitrogen, a mostly water-ice crust, an icy mantle and a substantial core of rock and metal. The core makes up two-thirds of its total mass.

Voyager 2 remains the only spacecraft to have visited Triton. As the probe was only able to study about 40% of the moon's surface, future missions (Dubbed "Trident") have been proposed to NASA via their Discovery Program to revisit the Neptune system with a focus on Triton.

Discovery and naming 

Triton was discovered by British astronomer William Lassell on October 10, 1846, just 17 days after the discovery of Neptune. When John Herschel received news of Neptune's discovery, he wrote to Lassell suggesting he search for possible moons. Lassell discovered Triton eight days later. Lassell also claimed for a period to have discovered rings. Although Neptune was later confirmed to have rings, they are so faint and dark that it is not plausible he saw them. A brewer by trade, Lassell spotted Triton with his self-built  aperture metal mirror reflecting telescope (also known as the "two-foot" reflector). This telescope was donated to the Royal Observatory, Greenwich in the 1880s, but was eventually dismantled.

Triton is named after the Greek sea god Triton (Τρίτων), the son of Poseidon (the Greek god corresponding to the Roman Neptune). The name was first proposed by Camille Flammarion in his 1880 book Astronomie Populaire, and was officially adopted many decades later. Until the discovery of the second moon Nereid in 1949, Triton was commonly referred to as "the satellite of Neptune". Lassell did not name his discovery; he later successfully suggested the name Hyperion, previously chosen by John Herschel, for the eighth moon of Saturn when he discovered it.

Orbit and rotation 

Triton is unique among all large moons in the Solar System for its retrograde orbit around its planet (i.e. it orbits in a direction opposite to the planet's rotation). Most of the outer irregular moons of Jupiter and Saturn also have retrograde orbits, as do some of Uranus's outer moons. However, these moons are all much more distant from their primaries, and are small in comparison; the largest of them (Phoebe) has only 8% of the diameter (and 0.03% of the mass) of Triton.

Triton's orbit is associated with two tilts, the obliquity of Neptune's rotation to Neptune's orbit, 30°, and the inclination of Triton's orbit to Neptune's rotation, 157° (an inclination over 90° indicates retrograde motion). Triton's orbit precesses forward relative to Neptune's rotation with a period of about 678 Earth years (4.1 Neptunian years), making its Neptune-orbit-relative inclination vary between 127° and 173°. That inclination is currently 130°; Triton's orbit is now near its maximum departure from coplanarity with Neptune's.

Triton's rotation is tidally locked to be synchronous with its orbit around Neptune: it keeps one face oriented toward the planet at all times. Its equator is almost exactly aligned with its orbital plane. At present, Triton's rotational axis is about 40° from Neptune's orbital plane, and hence as Neptune orbits the Sun, Triton's polar regions take turns facing the Sun, resulting in seasonal changes as one pole, then the other moves into the sunlight. Such changes were observed in 2010.

Triton's revolution around Neptune has become a nearly perfect circle with an eccentricity of almost zero. Viscoelastic damping from tides alone is not thought to be capable of circularizing Triton's orbit in the time since the origin of the system, and gas drag from a prograde debris disc is likely to have played a substantial role. Tidal interactions also cause Triton's orbit, which is already closer to Neptune than the Moon is to Earth, to gradually decay further; predictions are that 3.6 billion years from now, Triton will pass within Neptune's Roche limit. This will result in either a collision with Neptune's atmosphere or the breakup of Triton, forming a new ring system similar to that found around Saturn.

Capture 

The current understanding of moons in retrograde orbits means they cannot form in the same region of the solar nebula as the planets they orbit.  Therefore Triton must have been captured from elsewhere in the solar system. Astrophysicists believe it might have originated in the Kuiper belt, a ring of small icy objects extending from just inside the orbit of Neptune to about 50 AU from the Sun. Thought to be the point of origin for the majority of short-period comets observed from Earth, the belt is also home to several large, planet-like bodies including Pluto, which is now recognized as the largest in a population of Kuiper belt objects (the plutinos) locked in resonant orbits with Neptune. Triton is only slightly larger than Pluto and is nearly identical in composition, which has led to the hypothesis that the two share a common origin.

The proposed capture of Triton may explain several features of the Neptunian system, including the extremely eccentric orbit of Neptune's moon Nereid and the scarcity of moons as compared to the other giant planets. Triton's initially eccentric orbit would have intersected the orbits of irregular moons and disrupted those of smaller regular moons, dispersing them through gravitational interactions.

Triton's eccentric post-capture orbit would have also resulted in tidal heating of its interior, which could have kept Triton fluid for a billion years; this inference is supported by evidence of differentiation in Triton's interior. This source of internal heat disappeared following tidal locking and circularization of the orbit.

Two types of mechanisms have been proposed for Triton's capture. To be gravitationally captured by a planet, a passing body must lose sufficient energy to be slowed down to a speed less than that required to escape. An early theory of how Triton may have been slowed was by collision with another object, either one that happened to be passing by Neptune (which is unlikely), or a moon or proto-moon in orbit around Neptune (which is more likely). A more recent hypothesis suggests that, before its capture, Triton was part of a binary system. When this binary encountered Neptune, it interacted in such a way that the binary dissociated, with one portion of the binary expelled, and the other, Triton, becoming bound to Neptune. This event is more likely for more massive companions. This hypothesis is supported by several lines of evidence, including binaries being very common among the large Kuiper belt objects. The event was brief but gentle, saving Triton from collisional disruption. Events like this may have been common during the formation of Neptune, or later when it migrated outward.

However, simulations in 2017 showed that after Triton's capture, and before its orbital eccentricity decreased, it probably did collide with at least one other moon, and caused collisions between other moons.

Physical characteristics 

Triton is the seventh-largest moon and sixteenth-largest object in the Solar System and is modestly larger than the dwarf planets Pluto and Eris. It is also the largest retrograde moon in the solar system. It comprises more than 99.5% of all the mass known to orbit Neptune, including the planet's rings and thirteen other known moons, and is also more massive than all known moons in the Solar System smaller than itself combined. Also, with a diameter 5.5% that of Neptune, it is the largest moon of a gas giant relative to its planet in terms of diameter, although Titan is bigger relative to Saturn in terms of mass (the ratio of Triton's mass to that of Neptune is approximately 1:4788). It has a radius, density (2.061 g/cm3), temperature and chemical composition similar to that of Pluto.

Triton's surface is covered with a transparent layer of annealed frozen nitrogen. Only 40% of Triton's surface has been observed and studied, but it may be entirely covered in such a thin sheet of nitrogen ice. Like Pluto's, Triton's crust consists of 55% nitrogen ice with other ices mixed in. Water ice comprises 15–35% and frozen carbon dioxide (dry ice) the remaining 10–20%. Trace ices include 0.1% methane and 0.05% carbon monoxide. There could also be ammonia ice on the surface, as there are indications of ammonia dihydrate in the lithosphere. Triton's mean density implies that it probably consists of about 30–45% water ice (including relatively small amounts of volatile ices), with the remainder being rocky material. Triton's surface area is 23 million km2, which is 4.5% of Earth, or 15.5% of Earth's land area. Triton has an unusually high albedo, reflecting 60–95% of the sunlight that reaches it, and it has changed only slightly since the first observations. By comparison, the Moon reflects only 11%. Triton's reddish color is thought to be the result of methane ice, which is converted to tholins under exposure to ultraviolet radiation.

Because Triton's surface indicates a long history of melting, models of its interior posit that Triton is differentiated, like Earth, into a solid core, a mantle and a crust. Water, the most abundant volatile in the Solar System, comprises Triton's mantle, enveloping a core of rock and metal. There is enough rock in Triton's interior for radioactive decay to maintain a liquid subsurface ocean to this day, similar to what is thought to exist beneath the surface of Europa and several other icy outer Solar System worlds. This is not thought to be adequate to power convection in Triton's icy crust. However, the strong obliquity tides are believed to generate enough additional heat to accomplish this and produce the observed signs of recent surface geological activity. The black material ejected is suspected to contain organic compounds, and if liquid water is present on Triton, it has been speculated that this could make it habitable for some form of life.

Atmosphere 

Triton has a tenuous nitrogen atmosphere, with trace amounts of carbon monoxide and small amounts of methane near its surface. Like Pluto's atmosphere, the atmosphere of Triton is thought to have resulted from the evaporation of nitrogen from its surface. Its surface temperature is at least  because Triton's nitrogen ice is in the warmer, hexagonal crystalline state, and the phase transition between hexagonal and cubic nitrogen ice occurs at that temperature. An upper limit in the low 40s (K) can be set from vapor pressure equilibrium with nitrogen gas in Triton's atmosphere.

Turbulence at Triton's surface creates a troposphere (a "weather region") rising to an altitude of 8 km. Streaks on Triton's surface left by geyser plumes suggest that the troposphere is driven by seasonal winds capable of moving material over a micrometer in size. Unlike other atmospheres, Triton's lacks a stratosphere and instead has a thermosphere from altitudes of 8 to 950 km and an exosphere above that. A haze permeates most of Triton's troposphere, thought to be composed largely of hydrocarbons and nitriles created by the action of sunlight on methane. Triton's atmosphere also has clouds of condensed nitrogen that lie between 1 and 3 km from its surface.

In 1997, observations from Earth were made of Triton's limb as it passed in front of stars. These observations indicated the presence of a denser atmosphere than was deduced from Voyager 2 data. Other observations have shown an increase in temperature by 5% from 1989 to 1998. These observations indicated Triton was approaching an unusually warm southern hemisphere summer season that happens only once every few hundred years. Theories for this warming include a change of frost patterns on Triton's surface and a change in ice albedo, which would allow more heat to be absorbed. Another theory argues that temperature changes are a result of the deposition of dark, red material from geological processes. Because Triton's Bond albedo is among the highest in the Solar System, it is sensitive to small variations in spectral albedo.

Surface features 

All detailed knowledge of the surface of Triton was acquired from a distance of 40,000 km by the Voyager 2 spacecraft during a single encounter in 1989. The 40% of Triton's surface imaged by Voyager 2 revealed blocky outcrops, ridges, troughs, furrows, hollows, plateaus, icy plains and a few craters. Triton is relatively flat; its observed topography never varies beyond a kilometer. The impact craters observed are concentrated almost entirely in Triton's leading hemisphere. Analysis of crater density and distribution has suggested that in geological terms, Triton's surface is extremely young, with regions varying from an estimated 50 million years old to just an estimated 6 million years old. Fifty-five percent of Triton's surface is covered with frozen nitrogen, with water ice comprising 15–35% and frozen CO2 forming the remaining 10–20%. The surface shows deposits of tholins, organic chemical compounds that may be precursors to the origin of life.

Cryovolcanism 

One of the largest cryovolcanic features found on Triton is Leviathan Patera, a caldera-like feature roughly 100 km in diameter seen near the equator. Surrounding this caldera is a volcanic dome that stretches for roughly 2,000 km along its longest axis, indicating that Leviathan is the second largest volcano in the solar system by area, after Alba Mons. This feature is also connected to two enormous cryolava lakes seen northwest of the caldera. Because the cryolava on Triton is believed to be primarily water ice with some ammonia, these lakes would qualify as stable bodies of surface liquid water while they were molten. This is the first place such bodies have been found apart from Earth, and Triton is the only icy body known to feature cryolava lakes, although similar cryomagmatic extrusions can be seen on Ariel, Ganymede, Charon, and Titan.

The Voyager 2 probe observed 1989 a handful of geyser-like eruptions of nitrogen gas and entrained dust from beneath the surface of Triton in plumes up to 8 km high. Triton is thus, along with Earth, Io, Europa and Enceladus, one of the few bodies in the Solar System on which active eruptions of some sort have been observed. The best-observed examples are named Hili and Mahilani (after a Zulu water sprite and a Tongan sea spirit, respectively).

All the geysers observed were located between 50° and 57°S, the part of Triton's surface close to the subsolar point. This indicates that solar heating, although very weak at Triton's great distance from the Sun, plays a crucial role. It is thought that the surface of Triton probably consists of a translucent layer of frozen nitrogen overlying a darker substrate, which creates a kind of "solid greenhouse effect". Solar radiation passes through the thin surface ice sheet, slowly heating and vaporizing subsurface nitrogen until enough gas pressure accumulates for it to erupt through the crust. A temperature increase of just 4 K above the ambient surface temperature of 37 K could drive eruptions to the heights observed. Although commonly termed "cryovolcanic", this nitrogen plume activity is distinct from Triton's larger-scale cryovolcanic eruptions, as well as volcanic processes on other worlds, which are powered by internal heat. CO2 geysers on Mars are thought to erupt from its south polar cap each spring in the same way as Triton's geysers.

Voyager 2 images of Triton's southern hemisphere show many such streaks of dark material. Between 1977 and the Voyager 2 flyby in 1989, Triton shifted from a reddish color, similar to Pluto, to a far paler hue, suggesting that lighter nitrogen frosts had covered older reddish material. The eruption of volatiles from Triton's equator and their deposition at the poles may redistribute enough mass over 10,000 years to cause polar wander.

Polar cap, plains and ridges 

Triton's south polar region is covered by a highly reflective cap of frozen nitrogen and methane sprinkled by impact craters and openings of geysers. Little is known about the north pole because it was on the night side during the Voyager 2 encounter, but it is thought that Triton must also have a north polar ice cap.

The high plains found on Triton's eastern hemisphere, such as Cipango Planum, cover over and blot out older features, and are therefore almost certainly the result of icy lava washing over the previous landscape. The plains are dotted with pits, such as Leviathan Patera, which are probably the vents from which this lava emerged. The composition of the lava is unknown, although a mixture of ammonia and water is suspected.

Four roughly circular "walled plains" have been identified on Triton. They are the flattest regions so far discovered, with a variance in altitude of less than 200 m. They are thought to have formed from the eruption of icy lava. The plains near Triton's eastern limb are dotted with black spots, the maculae. Some maculae are simple dark spots with diffuse boundaries, and others comprise a dark central patch surrounded by a white halo with sharp boundaries.  The maculae typically have diameters of about 100 km and widths of the halos of between 20 and 30 km.

There are extensive ridges and valleys in complex patterns across Triton's surface, probably the result of freeze–thaw cycles. Many also appear to be tectonic and may result from an extension or strike-slip faulting. There are long double ridges of ice with central troughs bearing a strong resemblance to Europan lineae (although they have a larger scale), and which may have a similar origin, possibly shear heating from strike-slip motion along faults caused by diurnal tidal stresses experienced before Triton's orbit was fully circularized. These faults with parallel ridges expelled from the interior cross complex terrain with valleys in the equatorial region. The ridges and furrows, or sulci, such as Yasu Sulci, Ho Sulci, and Lo Sulci, are thought to be of intermediate age in Triton's geological history, and in many cases to have formed concurrently. They tend to be clustered in groups or "packets".

Cantaloupe terrain 

Triton's western hemisphere consists of a strange series of fissures and depressions known as "cantaloupe terrain" because it resembles the skin of a cantaloupe melon. Although it has few craters, it is thought that this is the oldest terrain on Triton. It probably covers much of Triton's western half.

Cantaloupe terrain, which is mostly dirty water ice, is only known to exist on Triton. It contains depressions  in diameter. The depressions (cavi) are probably not impact craters because they are all of the similar size and have smooth curves. The leading hypothesis for their formation is diapirism, the rising of "lumps" of less dense material through a stratum of denser material. Alternative hypotheses include formation by collapses, or by flooding caused by cryovolcanism.

Impact craters 

Due to constant erasure and modification by ongoing geological activity, impact craters on Triton's surface are relatively rare. A census of Triton's craters imaged by Voyager 2 found only 179 that were incontestable of impact origin, compared with 835 observed for Uranus's moon Miranda, which has only three percent of Triton's surface area. The largest crater observed on Triton thought to have been created by an impact is a  feature called Mazomba. Although larger craters have been observed, they are generally thought to be volcanic.

The few impact craters on Triton are almost all concentrated in the leading hemisphere—that facing the direction of the orbital motion—with the majority concentrated around the equator between 30° and 70° longitude, resulting from material swept up from orbit around Neptune. Because it orbits with one side permanently facing the planet, astronomers expect that Triton should have fewer impacts on its trailing hemisphere, due to impacts on the leading hemisphere being more frequent and more violent. Voyager 2 imaged only 40% of Triton's surface, so this remains uncertain. However, the observed cratering asymmetry exceeds what can be explained based on the impactor populations, and implies a younger surface age for the crater-free regions (≤ 6 million years old) than for the cratered regions (≤ 50 million years old).

Observation and exploration 

The orbital properties of Triton were already determined with high accuracy in the 19th century. It was found to have a retrograde orbit, at a very high angle of inclination to the plane of Neptune's orbit. The first detailed observations of Triton were not made until 1930. Little was known about the satellite until Voyager 2 flew by in 1989.

Before the flyby of Voyager 2, astronomers suspected that Triton might have liquid nitrogen seas and a nitrogen/methane atmosphere with a density as much as 30% that of Earth. Like the famous overestimates of the atmospheric density of Mars, this proved incorrect. As with Mars, a denser atmosphere is postulated for its early history.

The first attempt to measure the diameter of Triton was made by Gerard Kuiper in 1954. He obtained a value of 3,800 km. Subsequent measurement attempts arrived at values ranging from 2,500 to 6,000 km, or from slightly smaller than the Moon (3,474.2 km) to nearly half the diameter of Earth. Data from the approach of Voyager 2 to Neptune on August 25, 1989, led to a more accurate estimate of Triton's diameter (2,706 km).

In the 1990s, various observations from Earth were made of the limb of Triton using the occultation of nearby stars, which indicated the presence of an atmosphere and an exotic surface. Observations in late 1997 suggest that Triton is heating up and the atmosphere has become significantly denser since Voyager 2 flew past in 1989.

New concepts for missions to the Neptune system to be conducted in the 2010s were proposed by NASA scientists on numerous occasions over the last decades. All of them identified Triton as being a prime target and a separate Triton lander comparable to the Huygens probe for Titan was frequently included in those plans. No efforts aimed at Neptune and Triton went beyond the proposal phase and NASA's funding for missions to the outer Solar System is currently focused on the Jupiter and Saturn systems. A proposed lander mission to Triton, called Triton Hopper, would mine nitrogen ice from the surface of Triton and process it to be used as a propellant for a small rocket, enabling it to fly or 'hop' across the surface. Another concept, involving a flyby, was formally proposed in 2019 as part of NASA's Discovery Program under the name Trident. Neptune Odyssey is a mission concept for a Neptune orbiter with a focus on Triton being studied as a possible large strategic science mission by NASA that would launch in 2033 and arrive at the Neptune system in 2049.

Maps

See also 

 List of natural satellites
 List of geological features on Triton
 Neptune in fiction
 Triton Hopper, a proposed lander to Triton
 Triton's sky

Notes

References

External links 

 Triton profile at NASA's Solar System Exploration site
 
 Triton page at The Nine Planets
 Triton page (including labelled Triton map) at Views of the Solar System
 Triton map from Paul Schenk, Lunar and Planetary Institute
 Triton images from the NASA/JPL Photojournal
 Triton nomenclature from the USGS Planetary Nomenclature website

 
Irregular satellites
Former dwarf planets
18461010
M
Moons with a retrograde orbit